Smolensk Nuclear Power Plant ( []) is a nuclear power station in Russia. 
It is located in the Smolensk region, in Desnogorsk province, approximately 100 km from Smolensk, 115 km from Bryansk and 320 km from Moscow. Smolensk Nuclear Power Plant is the biggest power generating station in the north-western region of the united energy system of the Russian Federation. Smolensk NPP has an outer appearance similar to that of Chernobyl NPP units 3-4, as both are later generation RBMKs.

Construction and operation 

Construction began on the Smolensk NPP in the late 1970s. The NPP was originally intended to be constructed in two phases with units 1 and 2 starting in 1975 and 1976, followed by units 3 and 4 in the mid-late 1980s. Unit 3 began construction in  1984. However, the construction of the fourth reactor was interrupted by the Chernobyl disaster and plans were cancelled in 1993. The three RBMK-1000 reactors of Smolensk NPP were commissioned in 1982-1990 (1 st – Dec 24 1982, 2nd – Mar 30 1985 and 3 rd - Jan 30 1990). The reactors of Smolensk NPP are the improved versions of RBMK with a number of innovative safety systems. In the past years Smolensk NPP has generated as much as 283bln kWh and has proved its high efficiency and safety. The plant has been repeatedly proclaimed the best NPP in Russia and awarded by "Rosenergoatom" with the award of "Concern for excellent performance and safety". The plant has no negative effect on the nearby environment – in the past years the radiation background in the area has not changed and is stably within norm. Collectively, the three units of the Smolensk NPP have produced electricity equivalent to that of 90,000,000 tons of coal and have prevented the emission of 6,000,000 tons of airborne contaminants.

Safety systems and environmental impact 

All the units are equipped with emergency response systems, which can prevent release of radioactive material into the environment even in case of serious accident; for example breakage of pipes in the reactor cooling circuit. Also part of the emergency response system are special steam condensers which have a 3000 m2 capacity. Smolensk NPP has special systems that will be able to remove heat from the reactor even in case of the plant’s complete loss of electrical power. The environment radiation control sub-system conducts round-the-clock monitoring of a 30-km zone around the station, with the help of sensors installed all over the area which can detect abnormal radioactivity levels in, water, soil, plants and agricultural produce consumed by the local population. The findings of independent experts from the State Sanitary Inspection and the State Hydro-meteorological Committee say that the radiation background at Smolensk Nuclear Power Plant and in the nearby area is consistent with background radiation. Hence, Smolensk NPP is an ecologically friendly facility having no significant radiological or chemical effect on the population and the environment. The key goal set by the Smolensk NPP is to reduce the risk of incidents that may have negative effect on the personnel and the environment. All the measures provided for by the safety enhancement concept of "Rosenergoatom" Concern are aimed at reducing the risk of incidents at the REA NPPs. The safety declaration of Smolensk NPP says that the plant seeks to become the safest NPP in Russia.

Smolensk II Nuclear Power Station 
As the older RBMK units begin to be removed from service due to age, they are being replaced by modern VVER type reactors. The three sites (Kursk I, Leningrad I, Smolensk I) which all consist of 3+ RBMK reactors are going to be replaced with VVER-1200 units at Leningrad and VVER-TOI units at Smolensk and Kursk. The three RBMK reactors are expected to remain in operation until the new reactors are operational.

See also

 Nuclear power in Russia

References

Nuclear power stations in Russia
Nuclear power stations built in the Soviet Union
Nuclear power stations using RBMK reactors